Seventeen Assembly elections took place in 2007:

Ecuador 
2007 Ecuadorian Constituent Assembly election
2007 Ecuadorian Constituent Assembly referendum

India 
2007 Goa Legislative Assembly election
2007 Gujarat Legislative Assembly election
2007 Himachal Pradesh Legislative Assembly election
2007 Indian presidential election
2007 Punjab Legislative Assembly election
2007 Uttar Pradesh Legislative Assembly election
2007 Uttarakhand Legislative Assembly election

Japan 
2007 Higashiōsaka city assembly election
2007 Komae city assembly election
2007 Mukō city assembly election
2007 Shinagawa city assembly election
2007 Warabi city assembly election

Northern Ireland 
2007 Northern Ireland Assembly election

Wales 
2007 National Assembly for Wales election

Wallis and Futuna 
2007 Wallis and Futuna Territorial Assembly election

See also 
List of elections in 2007